This is the discography of Virgin Steele, an American Heavy metal band founded in 1981 in Long Island by Jack Starr. It includes twelve albums, two EP, and various other media.

Albums

(*) included in 2018 box set Seven Devils Moonshine

EPs 
 1983 - Wait for the Night
 2000 - Magick Fire Music

Compilations
 1983 - Burn the Sun
 2002 - Hymns to Victory (*)
 2002 - The Book of Burning (*)

(*) re-issues included in 2018 box set Seven Devils Moonshine

Singles
 1992 - Snakeskin Voodoo Man
 1998 - Through Blood and Fire

Videos/DVD
 1992 - Tale of the Snakeskin Voodoo Man

References

Heavy metal group discographies
Discographies of American artists